Ben Wa was an American electronic band from Oakland, California comprising Anthony "House" Chaba (programming and bass guitar) and Eric Ware (programming and keyboards), who had worked together before in bands such as Limbomaniacs, Big Janitor, and MCM & the Monster.

After releasing a four track EP 1 full of breaks and electro in 1998 they began recording their debut album Devil Dub featuring guest musicians such as guitarists Buckethead and M.I.R.V., drummer Bryan "Brain" Mantia and turntablist DJ Disk, plus Scientist live on stage for the release party in January 1999. Chaba and Ware had met Scientist when opening for Bill Laswell's Praxis in San Francisco.

Reviews for Devil Dub were positive with URB calling it "one of the most crucial records of any genre released this year" and Michelle Goldberg of Metro Silicon Valley stating: "The lazy pace is lulling, but like Tricky's music, it's more edgy and creepy than ethereal." Rick Anderson of Allmusic gave 4,5 out of 5 stars, writing: "This is remarkably pleasant stuff." Noah Wayne of online music magazine Splendid wrote: "It's campy, it's twisted, it's dub!"

Two of their tracks, "Re-Dub" and "Ephedream", were included on Laswell's releases Reanimator: Black Market Science and Tetragrammaton - Submerge. They also contributed tracks to a few other dub compilations.

Another EP called Elektro-Krazy followed in 2000, again concentrating on breaks and electro and described on Epitonic as "the gap between Detroit techno and funky dance floor breaks in a most ingenious way". Their next album Disciples Of Retro-Tech was released in 2001 as a double vinyl and single compact disc, featuring explorations of pure electro and synth-pop terrain. Stephen Cook of Allmusic wrote: "The hybrid mix is so inventive that suspect pastiche and old-school chic absolutely do not figure into it". He gave the album 4 out of 5 stars. Daiv Whaley of music newspaper Hear/Say concluded his review: "This is cool, accessible music for every child of man and machine. File under 'electro-funk,' file under 'fantastic.'"

Discography
 EP 1 (12" EP on Black Hole Records, 1998)
 Devil Dub (CD album on Black Hole Records, 1998)
 Elektro-Krazy (12" EP on Malvado Records, 2000)
 Retro-Tech EP (12" EP on Stray Records, 2001)
 Disciples Of Retro-Tech (Double vinyl and single CD album on Stray Records, 2001)

Devil Dub

Devil Dub is the 1999 debut album by San Francisco Bay Area band Ben Wa consisting of "Dr. Ware" and "House"(Limbomaniacs, Tommy Guerrero, Buckethead's Giant Robot, MCM & the Monster).

After forming in 1997, contributing to several compilations and releasing an EP in 1998, Devil Dub was the first full-length release by the duo. House sums up:

Guest musicians finally included avant-garde guitarist Buckethead, drummer Brain (with Primus at this time) and DJ Disk (from the Invisibl Skratch Piklz).

A critics from URB magazine called it "one of the most crucial records of any genre released this year".

Track listing

Personnel
Buckethead – guitar, neuro-pulse guitar-activated Larynx Modeler
DJ Disk – turntable, orange Bear
Brain – beats
M.I.R.V. – broken guitar
Adrian Isabell – percussion
Dr. Ware – keyboards, programming
House – bass, programming
Dow W. Patten – preacher
Recorded at Tyrell Studios, Oakland CA
Produced by Ben Wa.

Notes
Ben wa humbly acknowledged the following for inspiration: Scientist, Mad Professor, Lee 'Scratch' Perry, King Tubby, Sly and Robbie, Bill Laswell and Kraftwerk.

References

External links
 
 
 Official website as archived on July 28, 2009.
 GearTalk: Ben Wa. In: IGN, April 4, 2001.
 Chris Baty: Ben There, Done That. In: SF Weekly, October 17, 2001.
 Cleofus Williams: Runnin' With The Devil, gogorilla.com
 Michelle Goldberg on the album
 Interview by Martijn Busink, 2002

Electronic music groups from California
Musical groups established in 1998
Musical groups disestablished in 2001